Acy is an unincorporated community in the southeastern part of Louisiana, United States. The residents live along highways LA22, LA936, LA937, and many short parish side roads mostly named after current or past residents of the area. Acy consists of woodlands and pastures. Acy is a rural area located off a ridge surrounded by swamp lands.

References 

Unincorporated communities in Louisiana
Baton Rouge metropolitan area
Unincorporated communities in Ascension Parish, Louisiana